Lafontaine Bellot (Bellot dit Lafontaine) was Governor of Plaisance (Placentia), Newfoundland from 1664 to 1667.

Bellot was in charge of a small fort and garrison that protected the interests of the French fishery in the area. He was an ineffective governor who misused his power and was recalled in 1667.

See also 

 Governors of Newfoundland
 List of people from Newfoundland and Labrador

External links
Government House The Governorship of Newfoundland and Labrador
 

Lafontaine, Bellot dit